Doc Powell is an American jazz guitarist and composer. He was born and raised in Spring Valley, New York. He attended college at University of Charleston.

Career
He has worked with Wilson Pickett, who chose him to be his musical director. He has also worked in the same capacity for Luther Vandross for over a decade. He has also worked with high-profile musicians including Stevie Wonder, Bob James, Grover Washington, Jr., Aretha Franklin, Quincy Jones and Teddy Pendergrass.

Powell's debut album, Love Is Where It's At (1987), received a Grammy nomination for Best R&B Instrumental for his cover of Marvin Gaye's "What's Going On". His credits include work on the music for the feature films The Five Heartbeats and Down and Out in Beverly Hills.

Discography

Studio albums

Notes

External links
Official website

Living people
African-American guitarists
University of Charleston alumni
American jazz guitarists
Smooth jazz guitarists
Heads Up International artists
People from Spring Valley, New York
Guitarists from New York City
American male guitarists
Jazz musicians from New York (state)
American male jazz musicians
Year of birth missing (living people)
21st-century African-American people